Christinelund, originally a farm under Nysø Manor, is located a few kilometres east of central Præstø, on the island of Zealand's Jungshoved peninsula, in Vordingborg Municipality in southeastern Denmark. It takes its name from the salonist Christine Stampe and was frequently visited by Hans Christian Andersen in the 1850s, when it was the home of Henrik and Jonna Stampe. The current main building was completed in 1860 to a design by the architect Ferdinand Meldahl. It was listed on the Danish registry of protected buildings and places by the Danish Heritage Agency on 23 February 1978. The property is now operated as a bed and breakfast.

History

Origins

Nysø Manor was acquired by Holger Stampe in 1800 and became part of the Barony of Stampenborg in 1809. His son Henrik Stampe took up residence at one of the farms under the manor after his marriage to Christine Marguérite Salome Dalgas in 1820, renaming the property after his wife. Their two sons, Henrik and Holger, were born on the property in 1821 and 1822. Henrik and Christine Stampe took over Nysø in 1826.

The new house: Henrik and Jonna Stampe
 
Henrik and Christine Stampe's son Henrik initially studied law in Copenhagen but ran Christinelund after his marriage to Jonna Drewsen in 1850. The prominent architect Ferdinand Meldahl was commissioned to build the current main building in 1859–1860. Henrik and Jonna Stampe had four daughters: Rigmor, Astrid, Kristine, and Jeanina Emilie. Hans Christian Andersen created three "picture books" for the three oldest daughters.

Rigmor Stampe broke out of her noble environment when she married the Jewish composer Victor Bendix in 1879. He belonged to Georg Brandes' social circle. Astrid Stampe became a leading member of the Danish Women's Society in the 1880s. She also broke with her noble background, marrying Gustav Feddersen. Kristine Stampe died when she was just 27 years old in 1884. The youngest daughter, Jeanina Emilie Stampe, married Frederik de Jonquières who was prefect (amtmand) of Funen County.

Later history

The barony of Stampenborg, comprising Nysø Manor, Christinelund and several other farms, was passed on to Henrik Stampe when his father died in 1876. Christinelund was then used as a retirement home for his mother. The barony was passed on to Henrik Stampe's brother when he died without male heirs in 1892. Holger Stampe owned it until his death in 1904.

Architecture
The south-facing main building is built to a Historicist design with inspiration from Renaissance architecture. It has Dutch gables and many ornamental details. It consists of two storeys (including the fully used attic) over a cellar and rests on a black-painted stone foundation. The blue-glazed tile roof is broken up by a series of dormers. The building originally stood in blank red and yellow bricks but has now been painted white. The western gable has a bay window and on the south side of the building is a tower-like, two-storey avant-corps. A single-storey side wing extends from the rear side of the building. To the east of the main wing is a one-storey building which originally contained residences for the chauffeur and estate manager.

To the south of the main building is a large park. A courtyard and various farm buildings are situated to the north of the main wing.

Today
The estate is operated as a bed and breakfast.

List of owners
 (1858–1876) Henrik Stampe
 (1876–1892) Henrik Stampe
 ( 1892–1904) Holger Stampe-Charisius
 (1904–1925) Henrik Stampe
 (1925–1934) Enke Fru Stampe
 (1934–1960) Birgitte Henriksdatter Holst née Stampe
 (1960–1990) Peter Henrik Stampe Holst
 (1990–1999) Peter Henrik Stampe Holst/Marianne Stampe Holst née Themsen 
 (1999–2010) Peter Henrik Stampe Holst/Marianne Stampe Holst née Themsen (only the land)
 (1999–2006) D. S. I. Christinelund (main building and breeding farm)
 (2006–) Jan Grønhøj (main building, outbuildings and service buildings) and 
 (2010–) Marianne Stampe Holst née Themsen (only the land)

References

External links

 Official website
 Henrik Stampe
 H. C. Andersen and Hanrik and Jonna Stampe
 Source

Manor houses in Vordingborg Municipality
Listed buildings and structures in Vordingborg Municipality
Houses completed in 1860
1860 establishments in Denmark
Buildings in Denmark associated with Hans Christian Andersen